Thore Skredegaard (22 September 1909 – 8 May 2002) was a Norwegian sport shooter. He was born in Våle. He competed at the 1948 Summer Olympics in London, where he placed fifth in the 50 metre rifle prone.

References

1909 births
2002 deaths
People from Re, Norway
Norwegian male sport shooters
Olympic shooters of Norway
Shooters at the 1948 Summer Olympics
Sportspeople from Vestfold og Telemark
20th-century Norwegian people